Life is the fourth studio album by American rapper Yo Gotti. It was released on May 13, 2003, by TVT Records, serving as Yo Gotti's major-label debut and first studio release with TVT.

Critical reception 

Allmusic writer Jason Birchmeier awarded the album three stars and described it as "typical of the genre". Matt Gonzales of PopMatters also gave the album a lukewarm review, viewing Yo Gotti as "lyrically indistinguishable from a sea of bitter, street-hustling rappers exactly like himself". Geoff Harkness, writing for The Pitch saw merit in Gotti's lyrics, but opined that "the played-out beats, the hoary "Dirty South" shout-outs and Gotti's perfunctory delivery ... hinder the album beyond repair." The Memphis Flyer commented on the "vintage Def Jam-style production" and "facility with R&B hooks", and viewed the album as revealing "a wider range of musical and emotional options than is usually heard on Memphis rap records". The New York Times Kelefa Sanneh, reviewing his next album, described Life as "an uncelebrated gem". Several reviewers commented on the cover art, with Gonzales stating that from the cover the album could be mistaken "for a Wayans Brothers project skewering the worn-out conventions of hardcore rap". Harkness described the cover showing Yo Gotti "surrounded by snazzy cars, diamond-encrusted hubcaps and a flurry of $100 bills -- not exactly indicators that songs about the current political climate or uplifting one's spiritual self will be found inside."

Track listing

References

2003 debut albums
Yo Gotti albums